Emi Lo is an American voice actor and cosplayer of Chinese and Taiwanese descent. They are known for voice acting in anime dubs for Funimation and Bang Zoom! Entertainment.

Personal life 
Lo is agender and has a Siberian cat named Noctis.

Filmography

Anime series

Anime films

Animation

Video games

References

External links
 
 

1991 births
Living people
21st-century American actresses
American voice actors
Funimation
American non-binary actors
Actors from New York City
Agender people